Antwerp RC is a Belgian rugby club in Antwerp.

History
The club was founded in 1998, when Rugby Belgica Edegem Sport (RUBES) en Bricks Merksem joined forces.

External links
 Antwerp RC

Belgian rugby union clubs
Rugby clubs established in 1998
Sport in Antwerp